Sorya Shopping Center is a shopping mall in Phnom Penh, Cambodia. It has eight stories containing shops catering to the various needs of customers.

Gallery

References

Shopping malls in Phnom Penh